Ronald Maurice (Ronny) Naftaniel (born October 10, 1948 in Amsterdam) is the director of the Centrum Informatie en Documentatie Israël (Center for Information and Documentation Israel) (CIDI), in The Hague, The Netherlands.

Ronny Naftaniel is the son of a German Jew who had survived the Holocaust in the Netherlands after already having fled Nazi Germany in the aftermath of Kristallnacht in 1938. Naftaniel's father was immediately interned in Westerbork - in 1938 a refugee camp where Jews from Germany who had fled Nazi Germany were brought to - after crossing the border with the Netherlands. During the Nazi occupation of the Netherlands, he succeeded in preventing his own deportation to the death camps in occupied Poland. He was liberated by Canadian forces in 1945 while still being held in Westerbork, which had been transformed into a transit camp for more than 100,000 Dutch Jews to Auschwitz, Sobibor, Bergen-Belsen and Theresienstadt by the Nazis.

Ronny Naftaniel grew up in a liberal Jewish family that had little to do with the religious side of Judaism. In the roary 1960s, Naftaniel developed a particular interest in politics, especially in the left-wing Pacifist Socialist Party.

In the 1970s, Naftaniel started to change under the influence of the 1973 oil crisis and increasing criticism on Israel and its actions within Dutch society. Becoming more and more aware of his Jewish identity, Naftaniel joined CIDI, the Center for Information and Documentation Israel in 1976. CIDI was found in 1974 by Bob Levisson (just like Ronny Naftaniel's father also a survivor of Westerbork) with the goal of promoting a positive view on Israel and counter increasing criticism of Israel within Dutch society.

Naftaniel became director of CIDI in 1980, succeeding Levisson. Since then he has become a well-known figure, both within as well as outside the Dutch Jewish community. Eventually, during his 26 years as director, he became the face of CIDI. Praised by some, he is cursed by others.

Under Naftaniel, CIDI has expanded its task to monitoring anti-Semitism in the Netherlands besides challenging criticism of Israel. Naftaniel is a member of the Dutch Labour Party. He is also a Board Member of the Brussels-based organization CEJI - A Jewish Contribution to an Inclusive Europe.

External links 
  An article in the Dutch daily de Volkskrant
  Joods.nl

1948 births
Living people
Dutch Jews
Dutch non-fiction writers
Dutch political activists
Dutch Zionists
Writers from Amsterdam